The Beecham Baronetcy, of Ewanville in the Parish of Huyton in the County Palatine of Lancaster, is a title in the Baronetage of the United Kingdom. It was created on 17 July 1914 for the Lancashire pill manufacturer Joseph Beecham. Joseph was succeeded by his eldest son, Thomas, the second Baronet. Thomas was an influential conductor and notably founded the London Philharmonic Orchestra in 1932.

As of 2011 the title was believed to be held by Thomas' grandson, the presumed fifth Baronet. However, the latter has not successfully proven his succession and is therefore not on the Official Roll of the Baronetage, with the baronetcy considered dormant. For more information, follow this link.

Beecham baronets, of Ewanville (1914)
Sir Joseph Beecham, 1st Baronet (1848–1916)
Sir Thomas Beecham, 2nd Baronet (1879–1961)
Sir Adrian Welles Beecham, 3rd Baronet (1904–1982)
John Stratford Roland Beecham, the presumed 4th Baronet (1940–2011)
Robert Adrian Beecham, presumed 5th Baronet (b. 1942)

The heir apparent to the baronetcy should it be proven is the presumed 5th Baronet's son, Michael John Beecham (b. 1972).

Notes

References

Beecham